From 1984 to 2002, the Free State of Bavaria biennially awarded its Karl-Vossler-Preis, named after Karl Vossler, to authors of scientific literature of distinguished literary quality written in German. The award was aimed at fostering the status of German as an academic language and came with a prize money of 25,000 marks until 2000, and 12,500 Euros in 2002. It alternated with the Jean-Paul-Preis, another literary prize biennially awarded by Bavaria since 1983.

Laureates 
Source:
 1984: Hubert Markl, biologist
 1986: Josef Isensee, jurist
 1988: Wolf Lepenies, sociologist
 1990: Friedrich Cramer, biochemist
 1992: Harald Weinrich, linguist
 1994: Hans-Martin Gauger, philologist and linguist
 1996: Arnold Esch, historian
 1998: Peter Gülke, musicologist
 2000: Dieter Borchmeyer, philologist and dramatician
 2002: Otfried Höffe, philosopher

References

External links 
 “Literaturpreise des Freistaates Bayern” at the website of the Bavarian State Ministry of Sciences, Research and the Arts (German)

Awards established in 1984
2002 disestablishments in Germany
German non-fiction literary awards
Literary awards of Bavaria